(11 December 1935 – 16 April 2004) was a Japanese former pole vaulter who competed in the 1960 Summer Olympics and the 1958 Asian Games.

References

1935 births
2004 deaths
Japanese male pole vaulters
Olympic male pole vaulters
Olympic athletes of Japan
Athletes (track and field) at the 1960 Summer Olympics
Asian Games gold medalists for Japan
Asian Games gold medalists in athletics (track and field)
Athletes (track and field) at the 1958 Asian Games
Medalists at the 1958 Asian Games
Universiade medalists in athletics (track and field)
Universiade gold medalists for Japan
Medalists at the 1959 Summer Universiade
Japan Championships in Athletics winners